The Liken Series is a continuing musical based on events in the Old Testament and New Testament of the Bible, as well as stories from the Book of Mormon. The series is popular among many Latter-day Saint (LDS/Mormon) families.

Intended audience

According to the Liken website, "If you're concerned about what is going on in today's mainstream media, we think you'll like what you find here at Liken", because "we don't believe "family friendly" means it has to be boring." Further, "you'll find movies and music that will not only entertain your family, but uplift and inspire them as well."

Reception
According to LDS Cinema Online, which reviews films from a Mormon perspective, "if you’re looking for spiritually challenging, deeply insightful cinema for adults, Liken is far from your ideal. Neither is any of these films a paragon of cinematic technique, acting, comedic or musical performance, etc. The films have their weaknesses to be sure", but "Whatever the case, the filmmakers have gotten something right. It’s a formula that catches kids’ attention and causes them to remember what they see".

A Herald Extra writer wrote "From the beginning, the “Liken” films have been noted for their energetic, catchy music, which is a major element of “Jonah and the Great Fish."

Characters
Characters are listed by movie release order. A full cast list is not included.

Dreamers
Spencer
Amelia
Devon
Chloe

Story Tellers
Spencer's Primary teacher.
Spencer's brother.
Amelia's Parents.
George (Butler to Amelia's family and later as Devon's Grandfather)
Amelia's choir teacher.
Missionaries
Chloe's Father.

Main characters
Nephi
Ammon
David
Alma
Mary, Joseph, and Jesus This is a Nativity Story.
Esther
Daniel
Samuel the Lamanite
Jonah

Episodes
Release Dates

Old Testament

New Testament

Book of Mormon

Notable Cast

References

American film series